The Rugby World Cup is a rugby union tournament held every four years and contested by the men's national teams of the member unions of World Rugby. The Wales national rugby union team has participated in all nine Rugby World Cup tournaments. Up to and including 2015, hosting of the tournament alternated between traditional rugby heartlands in the southern hemisphere and those in Europe. Wales was the primary host in 1999, with Cardiff's Millennium Stadium built to coincide with the event, and the other three tournaments played in Europe have also used venues in Wales to some degree. Cardiff's Millennium Stadium and its predecessor, the Cardiff Arms Park, will have hosted a total 21 matches over a total of four World Cups. This is the largest number of World Cup games hosted by one venue.

The 1987 tournament was Wales' most successful; they won all three pool matches and their quarter-final, before losing to New Zealand in the semi-finals. They then faced Australia in the third place play-off match, which they won 22–21. In the next two tournaments in 1991 and 1995, Wales failed to progress beyond the pool stage, winning just one match in each tournament. Both the 1999 and 2003 tournaments were more successful, with Wales qualifying for the quarter-finals both times. Wales hosted the event in 1999 and topped their pool only to lose to eventual winners Australia in the quarter-finals. In 2003, they finished second in their pool to New Zealand and faced England in the quarter-finals, where they lost to the eventual champions, despite scoring more tries than their opponents. In the 2007 World Cup, Wales again failed to progress from the pool stage. After a loss to Australia, and two wins against Japan and Canada, they lost by four points to Fiji, despite scoring more tries than their opponents. At the 2011 World Cup, Wales reached the semi-finals for the first time since 1987. Playing the semi-finals against France, Wales lost 9–8, in a game overshadowed by the 18th-minute sending off of Wales' captain Sam Warburton for a dangerous tackle against Vincent Clerc. At the 2015 World Cup Wales were in the same pool as Australia, England, Fiji and Uruguay. They finished second in the pool behind Australia and ahead of hosts England. South Africa defeated Wales in the quarter-final. In the 2019 World Cup, Wales were in pool D with Australia, Fiji, Georgia and Uruguay. They won all their group matches to finish top of the pool. After defeating France in the quarter-final, they lost to the eventual tournament winners South Africa in the semi-final.

Overall

Team ranking

1987 New Zealand & Australia

Pool stage

Knockout stage

Quarter-final

Semi-final

Third place play-off

1991 UK, Ireland & France

Hosting
England was billed as the main host of the second tournament in 1991, hosting the opening ceremony, and final, though the hosting duties were shared between all countries which competed in the Five Nations Championship. France hosted eight games, England and Wales each hosted seven, and Scotland and Ireland five. The National Stadium in Cardiff hosted the third place playoff, whilst all of Pool C's matches were played in Wales. Wales were scheduled to feature in this pool, and all three of their pool matches were hosted in the National Stadium. One game each was played at the club grounds of Pontypridd, Pontypool and Llanelli.

The following Welsh stadiums were used:

Pool stage

1995 South Africa

Pool stage

1999 Wales

Hosting

Wales was chosen by the International Rugby Board as the principal host for the 1999 event. The centrepiece venue of the tournament, hosting the opening ceremony and final was the Millennium Stadium, a new structure built on the site of the old National Stadium at Cardiff Arms Park at a cost of £126 million from private investment. An agreement was reached with the unions of all four rivals in the Five Nations Championship (England, France, Ireland and Scotland), so that, like 1991, the majority of the matches would take place outside the official host nation. In a unique tournament format there were five pools in the opening round. Each of the five unions competed in a separate pool, and acted as host for all of the matches within that pool. All Pool A games were held in Scotland, Pool B games in England, Pool C games in France and Pool E games in Ireland.

Wales hosted Pool D, also featuring Argentina, Samoa and Japan. Four of the pool games were at the Millennium Stadium, with one match each at Stradey Park, Llanelli's rugby stadium, and at The Racecourse, Wrexham, which usually featured Association Football.

Of eleven knock-out games, the Millennium Stadium only hosted three; Australia's defeat of Wales in the quarter-final stage, and the third place play-off and final. The other fixtures were played for at a variety of European venues.

The following Welsh stadiums were used:

Pool stage

Knockout stage

Quarter-final

2003 Australia

Pool stage

Knockout stage

Quarter-final

2007 France

Hosting
In a more public bidding process, France beat England to win the right to host the 2007 World Cup. The WRU supported the French bid, in accordance with an agreement between the nations over the 1999 cup. As a result of that agreement, World Cup rugby returned to the Millennium Stadium for three pool matches (including two featuring Wales), and a quarter-final.

Ironically, as France were unexpected runners-up to Argentina in their group, the hosts found themselves competing in this, the only knock-out match held outside of their borders. The game was one of the highlights of the tournament, notable for a large number of reasons, though largely for being New Zealand's earliest exit from a Rugby World Cup, after the New Zealand Herald ran the hubristic headline 'France pose absolutely no threat to All Blacks'. The French squad's reply to the Haka, where the squad dressed in red, white and blue shirts, drew some attention, with a number of images of Sebastien Chabal's stony face appearing in the media the following day. Several controversial decisions by referee Wayne Barnes, provoked death threats from some fans. Statistical analysis by New Zealand company Verusco showed the match's playing time, that is time the ball is in play, was the longest of any of the 1,500 games they had ever recorded.

Pool stage

2011 New Zealand

Pool stage

Knockout stage

Quarter-final

Semi-final

Bronze medal match

2015 England

Hosting

In 2009 England were awarded the rights to stage the 2015 tournament. Owing to the proximity of Cardiff, the RFU made it clear that they intended to use the Millennium Stadium as part of its bid, despite initial reluctance from the IRB for multiple hosting nations. The Millennium Stadium hosted eight games in the tournament, more than in any previous world cup. These include two quarter-finals. This made Cardiff the only venue hosting knock-out matches with the exception of England's national stadium, Twickenham, as well as the venue with the second highest number of games. As Wales and England were drawn in the same group, Wales only had home advantage for two of their games, against Uruguay and Fiji.

Cardiff used the World Cup to promote tourism in the city, with estimates that the games would add over £300 million to the local economy. A 'Fan Zone' had been created within the grounds of Cardiff Arms Park with a large screen, for enjoying match days. Cardiff Council has commissioned an art installation to mark the tournament, grafting a rugby ball to the prominent Cardiff Castle, to make it appear the ball has smashed straight through the wall. This was similar to a publicity stunt from the 2007 World Cup, where a rugby ball hung from the centre of the Eiffel Tower. No other such sculptures had been created in the other 2015 venue cities.

Pool stage

Knockout stage

Quarter-final

2019 Japan

Pool stage

Knockout stage

Quarter-final

Semi-final

Bronze final

By opponent

References
 Davies, Gerald (2004) The History of the Rugby World Cup (Sanctuary Publishing Ltd,
 Farr-Jones, Nick, (2003). Story of the Rugby World Cup, Australian Post Corporation,

Wales national rugby union team
Rugby World Cup by nation